"Stay" is a song by Irish singer-songwriter and Boyzone member Stephen Gately from his debut solo album, New Beginning. It was released as the third single from the album on 12 May 2001. The song peaked at number 13 on the UK Singles Chart.

Track listing
UK CD single #1
 "Stay" - 3:47
 "I Can Dream" - 3:38
 "Stay" (Almighty Remix) - 7:19

UK CD single #2
 "Stay" - 3:47
 "Games of Love" (Performance with Boyzone)

Charts

References

2000 songs
Songs written by Mikkel Storleer Eriksen
Songs written by Hallgeir Rustan
Song recordings produced by Stargate (record producers)
Polydor Records singles
2001 singles